is a trans-Neptunian object and centaur from the scattered disk and/or inner Oort cloud, located in the outermost region of the Solar System. The object with a highly eccentric orbit of 0.99 was first observed by astronomers with the Spacewatch program at Steward Observatory on 31 March 2009.

Description 

Using an epoch of February 2017, it has the second-largest heliocentric semi-major axis of a minor planet not detected out-gassing like a comet. ( has a larger heliocentric semi-major axis.)  does have a barycentric semi-major axis of 1032 AU. For the epoch of July 2018  will have its largest heliocentric semi-major axis of 1644 AU.

 passed 5.7 AU from Saturn in February 2009 and came to perihelion in March 2011 at a distance of 14.5 AU from the Sun (inside the orbit of Uranus). In 2018, it will move from 18.2 AU to 19.1 AU from the Sun. It comes to opposition in late March. With an absolute magnitude (H) of 7.1, the object has a published diameter of 185 and 188 kilometers, respectively.

With an observation arc of 14.7 years, it has a well constrained orbit. It will not be 50 AU from the Sun until 2047. After leaving the planetary region of the Solar System,  will have a barycentric aphelion of 2049 AU with an orbital period of 33100 years. In a 10 million year integration of the orbit, the nominal (best-fit) orbit and both 3-sigma clones remain outside 12.2 AU (qmin) from the Sun. Summary of barycentric orbital parameters are:
 Semi-major axis: ~1032 AU
 aphelion: ~2049 AU
 period: ~33,100 yr
Archived data from the JPL SBDB and MPC.

Comparison

See also 

 
 
 
 
 90377 Sedna
 List of hyperbolic comets
 Planet Nine

Notes

References

External links 
 2012 DR30 - Ein Transneptun mit ungewöhnlicher Bahn, www.spektrum.de, March 2012 
 Mysterious solar system object 2012 DR30: period ~50,000 years, inclination 75°, perihelion 14 AU
 Transneptunian Object 2012 DR30 Is it a comet?
 Images 2012 DR30
 2012 DR30  (Seiichi Yoshida)
 Webcite archive of Epoch 2016-Jan-13 with aphelion (Q) of 2789 AU
 
 

Damocloids

Trans-Neptunian objects
Inner Oort cloud
Minor planet object articles (unnumbered)

20120222